Brandon Wade Fahey (born January 18, 1981) is an American former professional baseball utility player. He played high school baseball for Duncanville High School in Duncanville, Texas.  While living at Duncanville, his father Bill Fahey played baseball for the San Francisco Giants of Major League Baseball (MLB).

Career

College years
Fahey went to Grayson County College winning the Junior College National Championship before transferring to the University of Texas, where he played baseball for a year. He hit .303 in 45 games as the Longhorns won the National Championship in 2002.

Baltimore Orioles 
Fahey was selected by the Baltimore Orioles in the 12th round (346th overall) of the 2002 Major League Baseball draft. He was previously selected by the San Diego Padres in the 17th round (532nd overall) of the 1999 MLB draft, and by the Orioles in the 32nd round (954th overall) of the 2000 MLB draft, but did not sign on both occasions. In , he was called up from the Orioles' Triple-A affiliate, the Ottawa Lynx, when regular second baseman Brian Roberts went on the disabled list. On May 16, 2006, Fahey hit his first career home run off Boston Red Sox starting pitcher Curt Schilling.

On September 21, 2008, during the last game played at Yankee Stadium, Fahey entered the game as a pinch runner and remained in the game to play shortstop. He recorded the last ever error in the history of the original Yankee Stadium during the bottom of the seventh inning, allowing Xavier Nady to reach first base.

Toronto Blue Jays 
On January 26, 2009, Fahey signed a minor league contract with the Toronto Blue Jays.

See also
List of second-generation Major League Baseball players

References

External links

1981 births
Living people
Aberdeen IronBirds players
American expatriate baseball players in Canada
Baltimore Orioles players
Baseball players from Dallas
Bowie Baysox players
Frederick Keys players
Grayson Vikings baseball players
Major League Baseball left fielders
Major League Baseball second basemen
Major League Baseball shortstops
Major League Baseball third basemen
Norfolk Tides players
Ottawa Lynx players
People from Duncanville, Texas
Peoria Javelinas players
Texas Longhorns baseball players
Duncanville High School alumni